Chak Mansur is one of 38 villages in the rural Mansurchak Block of the Begusarai district of the state of Bihar in India.

References

External links 
 Chak Mansur on Wikivillage

Villages in Begusarai district